This is a list of the fifty most populous metropolitan areas in North America as of 2015, the most recent year for which official census results, estimates or projections are available for every major metropolitan area in North America. Where available, it uses official definitions of metropolitan areas based on the concept of a single urban core and its immediate surroundings, as opposed to polycentric conurbations. These definitions vary from country to country. Figures refer to mid-2015 populations except in the case of Mexican metropolitan areas, whose figures derive from the 2015 Intercensal Survey conducted by INEGI with a reference date of 15 March 2015. Havana has no official definition of its metropolitan area; the population within its city limits is given instead.

Sources: 

 Mexico
 United States
 Canada
 Dominican Republic
 Guatemala
 Haiti
 Cuba
 Panama

Notes

References

 
North America
Metropolitan areas
North American metropolitan areas